Richard Dwight Butler (born May 1, 1973) is a Canadian former outfielder in Major League Baseball for the Toronto Blue Jays and Tampa Bay Devil Rays. He is the brother of another former Blue Jay, Rob Butler.

Career 
Butler was signed as a non-drafted free agent by the Toronto Blue Jays on September 24, 1990. After seven years in Minor League Baseball, he was called up to play for the major league club on September 6, 1997. He played seven games that season with the Blue Jays.

In the Major League Baseball expansion draft of 1997, Butler was selected 10th overall by the Tampa Bay Devil Rays. In Tampa Bay's inaugural season of 1998, Butler played in 72 games at the major league level and 38 games with the Triple-A Durham Bulls.

Butler remained at AAA Durham in 1999, where he played 90 games. He was called up to the Devil Rays again, but this time only for seven games.

On October 15, 1999, Butler was granted free agency. A month later, he was signed by the Seattle Mariners, although he never made it back to the big leagues.

After his MLB career Butler played for the minor league Toronto Maple Leafs from 2001 to 2002.

Highlights 
1992 - A Ball Myrtle Beach Hurricanes, South Atlantic League Champions

1993 - Florida State League All Star, voted most exciting player of the year by Baseball America

1996 - Australian League MVP, Sydney Blues

1997 - First MLB hit, September 9

1998 - First MLB home run, April 1

Statistics 
Batting

Fielding

 minor league fielding statistics not available

References

External links

Pelota Binaria (Venezuelan Winter League)

1973 births
Living people
Baseball outfielders
Baseball players from Toronto
Canadian expatriate baseball players in the United States
Cardenales de Lara players
Canadian expatriate baseball players in Venezuela
Dunedin Blue Jays players
Durham Bulls players
Gulf Coast Blue Jays players
Knoxville Smokies players
Major League Baseball left fielders
Major League Baseball players from Canada
Myrtle Beach Hurricanes players
New Haven Ravens players
Niagara Stars players
Oklahoma RedHawks players
Syracuse Chiefs players
Syracuse SkyChiefs players
Tacoma Rainiers players
Tampa Bay Devil Rays players
Toronto Blue Jays players
Canadian expatriate baseball players in Australia